The Grand Prix Cycliste de Québec is a one-day professional bicycle road race held in Quebec City, Quebec, Canada. Its first edition was on September 10, 2010, as the penultimate event in the 2010 UCI ProTour.

The Grand Prix Cycliste de Québec and the Grand Prix Cycliste de Montréal held two days later are collectively known as the "Laurentian Classics" . Australian cyclist Simon Gerrans was the first to achieve a Laurentian double by winning both races in the same year in 2014. Fellow Australian cyclist Michael Matthews also achieved this double in 2018.

Route
The Grand Prix Cycliste de Québec, unlike many single day events, is not a point to point race, but a circuit based race. The riders race for 11 laps on an 18.1 km long circuit. During a lap on the circuit the riders need to complete four climbs in rapid succession: Côte de la Montagne (375m long and 10% average grade), Côte de la Potasse (420m long and 9% average grade), Montée de la Fabrique (190m long and 7% average grade) and Montée du Fort (1000m long and 4% average grade). The finish is uphill on the Montée du Fort.

During the 2014 edition, riders had to take an alternate route because of construction on the Côte Gilmour.

Winners

Multiple winners
Riders in italics are still active

Wins per country

References

External links

 
 

 
UCI ProTour races
Cycle races in Canada
Recurring sporting events established in 2010
Sport in Quebec City
2010 establishments in Quebec
UCI World Tour races
Annual sporting events in Canada